Denis Reynolds is the President of the Children's Court of Western Australia. He was sworn into this position in February 2004, and took over as President from Judge Kate O'Brien in March 2004.

Reynolds was brought up in the Perth suburb of Wembley and attended local schools: the Brigidine Convent in Wembley, Marist Brothers College in Subiaco and Newman College, Churchlands.

Reynolds studied law at the University of Western Australia. He was admitted as a lawyer in 1977 and worked for a number of private law firms before becoming a magistrate seven years later, 1984, in Kalgoorlie. In 1987 he moved back to Perth and continued working as a magistrate until being appointed a commissioner of the District Court in 1997. He was President of the Magistrates' Society from 1990 until 1997.

References 
Brief : Journal of the Law Society of Western Australia,  April 2004

The West Australian, 6 February 2004

The West Australian, 10 February 2004

External links 
 Children's Court of Western Australia

University of Western Australia alumni
Australian magistrates
People educated at Newman College, Perth
People from Perth, Western Australia
Living people
20th-century Australian judges
21st-century Australian judges
Judges of the District Court of Western Australia
Year of birth missing (living people)